"Toes" is a song recorded by Canadian singer-songwriter Lights for her second studio album, Siberia (2011). The song made its radio premiere on 104.5 CHUM-FM on August 5, 2011 and was released digitally on August 16, 2011 as the official lead single for the album. It debuted and peaked at number 62 on the Canadian Hot 100. "Toes" was released to the UK in July 2012.

Composition
"Toes" is written in the key of F minor and set to an approximate tempo of 124 BPM.

Critical reception
In a review of Siberia, James Murray of musicOMH wrote that "Toes" had a "contagious" pop chorus and exemplified "some of the best songwriting Lights has to offer." Matt Collar of AllMusic labelled "Toes" an "album pick" and described it as a "sparkling, anthemic" song that brings to mind popular contemporaries.

Music video
The music video for "Toes" premiered September 14, 2011. The video features Lights' hometown, Toronto, mostly in Dufferin Station. Lights is shown playing with her band in a brightly lit room. She then gets out of a taxi and goes to a skate park and a subway. Afterwards she goes back to the brightly lit room to play with her band. The video ends with a shot of LIGHTS walking away on a sidewalk.

Track listing

Notes

Charts

Release history

References

2011 songs
2011 singles
Lights (musician) songs
Universal Music Group singles
Songs written by Lights (musician)